Ştefan Stoica (1976 – 4 February 2014) was a  Romanian politician. He was a member of the Senate from 2012 to 2014.

A physician by profession, he was a member of the Democratic Liberal Party before switching to the People's Party – Dan Diaconescu, and he was elected while belonging to that party, for a seat in Ialomița County. In October 2013, he defected to the Social Democratic Party.

Stoica died of cancer at the age of 37.

References

1976 births
2014 deaths
Members of the Senate of Romania
Social Democratic Party (Romania) politicians
Deaths from cancer in Romania
Democratic Liberal Party (Romania) politicians
People's Party – Dan Diaconescu politicians
21st-century Romanian physicians
20th-century Romanian physicians